Have You Seen This Woman? is a Serbian fantasy drama film directed by Dušan Zorić and Matija Gluščević. It stars Ksenija Marinković as Draginja, a middle-aged woman trapped in the roles which patriarchal society tries to impose on her. The film is the directing duo's feature debut.

Have You Seen This Woman? premiered at the 37th International Critics' Week of the 79th Venice International Film Festival on September 8, 2022.

The film features the final performance of the late Vlasta Velisavljević.

Synopsis
In the heat of a summer day, Draginja discovers a dead body that resembles her. In the heat of a summer day, Draginja hires a fake husband to show off in front of her friends. In the cold of a winter night, Draginja roams the streets hoping to recover her lost memory. Through three different life possibilities, a middle-aged woman tries to get out of her skin.

Cast

Production
During production, the film was known under the working title Metamorphoses and it took over six years to complete. The project participated in the First Cut Lab consultancy programme, where it was mentored by Radu Jude, among others. It also took part in the First Cut + workshop at the Karlovy Vary International Film Festival  and it won the image post-production award at the Thessaloniki International Film Festival Agora Works-in-progress 2019.

Reception
Have You Seen This Woman?, described by the delegate general of the Venice International Film Critics' Week Beatrice Fiorentino as "the most incredibly unsettling film in the selection", opened in Venice to positive reviews.

Screen Daily described the film as "intriguing and often disconcerting" and pointed at Ksenija Marinković's "committed, sensitive and big-hearted" performance.

Italian newspaper Il manifesto said that the three Draginja's in the film played by the "excellent Ksenija Marinković" are "three symbols of an unstoppable decline, of a radical loneliness" and called the film "a remarkable debut".

Cineuropa underlined the film's surprising narrative, "one of the driving forces" of an "emotionally engaging film".

Accolades

References

External links
 

2022 films
Serbian fantasy drama films